The mass media in Serbia refers to mass media outlets based in Serbia. Both state-owned and for-profit corporations operate television, magazines, and newspapers, which depend on advertising, subscription, and other sales-related revenues. The Constitution of Serbia guarantees freedom of speech.

Serbia's media system is transforming, yet "slow, incoherent and incomplete." According to the European Journalism Centre, "democratization of the media system has failed to become a factor in the democratization of society as a whole, which was a widespread hope in 2000 based on the achievements of the decade-long struggle against media repression in the Milosevic regime." Serbia ranks 93rd out of 180 countries in the 2020 Press Freedom Index report compiled by Reporters Without Borders.

History
The 1990s saw the end of state monopoly over the media. Throughout the decade, media remained divided between state-controlled and independent ones. Media autonomy and the survival of independent media remained a major bone of contention during the rule of Slobodan Milosevic. During this time, the media was a tool against domestic and international enemies. Civil society and international donors stood behind the creation of independent media. According to the Association for Private Broadcasting Development, in the year 2000 Serbia hosted 480 radio and TV stations, of which 300 were privately owned and the rest were local, public media.

The control over the media was reached through different strategies. On the one hand, the legal framework on the media system was purposefully left chaotic, while the state maintained the monopoly over the distribution of frequencies and production of newsprints, printing facilities, and distribution networks. Moreover, non-aligned journalists, media outlets and media advertisers were harassed, jammed and/or forcefully closed down – particularly if perceived as dangerous to the government, such as elections, the 1996–97 mass demonstrations, and the 1998–99 war in Kosovo.

After the overthrow of Slobodan Milošević, most state media changed overnight and supported the new ruling coalition, DOS. The political changes made way for the reconstruction of the media sector. Yet, post-Milošević governments were unable to bring the transition to completion. A media policy was neglected for the whole decade 2001–2010, not to risk electoral support by unsettling the status quo.

The media sector was thus reformed slowly and incoherently, after a long delay. In 2010, Serbia had 523 print media, 201 radio stations, 103 TV stations and 66 online media. Almost 2.2 million Serbian citizens regularly read print media every day and listen to radio for on average almost three hours a day. Yet, media sustainability remains at risk due to small advertisement revenues. New challenges include increasing concentration of the advertisement sector, opening up to the risk of pressures from economic groups linked to political parties, as well as the dire general economic conditions in the wake of the global economic crisis. The South East European Media Observatory estimated that 25-40% of media advertising revenue in 2014 came from the state; such public spending is not regulated.

Legislative framework

Serbia is part of the European Convention on Human Rights and of the UN International Covenant on Civil and Political Rights, both imposing obligations to protect freedom of expression and information.

The Constitution of Serbia guarantees freedom of expression (including freedom of speech and press, art. 46) and allows for its restriction only "to protect the rights and reputation of others, to uphold the authority and objectivity of the courts and to protect public health, morals of a democratic society and national security of the Republic of Serbia" – as in compliance with the standards set by the European Convention on Human Rights.

It is a constitutional right, in Serbia, to freely establish media without prior authorization (art. 50). Licenses, required for TV and radio stations, are granted by an independent body, the Republic Broadcasting Agency (RBA). Censorship is prohibited by the Constitution.

The legislative framework on the media in Serbia includes a Law on Public Information, a Law on Broadcasting, a Law on Free Access to Information of Public Importance and a Law on Elections of the Members of the Parliament (regulating electoral coverage). The Public Information Law explicitly protects journalistic secrecy, and the Criminal Code excludes journalists from the obligation to disclose their sources to the courts, unless for grave crimes (punishable by more than 5 years sentences, art.41) Despite the 2004 Law on Free Access to Information of Public Importance, media efforts are often obstructed by authorities.

The Broadcasting Law foresees a specific media concentration regime, restricting the ownership of two or more terrestrial TV or radio stations within the same or overlapping area, as well as the cross-ownership of TVs, radios, daily newspapers and news agencies. Yet, these norms are almost impossible to be implemented when ownership of media is often obscure. The lack of transparency of media ownership is reported as one of the main issues of the sectors.

In 2012, the real owners of 18 over 30 major news outlets in Serbia remained unknown. In 2009 a Media Register was introduced by amending the Public Information Law; yet, the amendments were later declared unconstitutional.

Defamation is decriminalised since 2012. Insult is still a criminal offense, but not punishable by prison - although journalists can be imprisoned if unable to pay the associated harsh fines. The 2009 Data Secrecy law foresees the liability of journalists if they reveal information related to national security, public safety, and foreign affairs.

Legal protections for freedom of speech and of the press are not consistently hold in practice.
Three new media laws were adopted in August 2014, bringing the Serbian legal framework closer to EU standards. 
The three laws, part of the EU-backed 2011 Media Strategy, foresee the privatisation of almost all publicly owned media outlets, and the end of direct state subsidies by mid 2015, replaced by a system of grants (public service broadcasters RTS and RTV, as well as minority media, are exempt from privatisation, and are funded by a subscription fee since 2016). The laws also establishes a media register for the disclosure of media ownership structures, and the preparation for digitalisation of television by 2015. Their implementation remains to be checked.

The government is committed to the completion of the privatisation strategy for media outlets, but in the past several privatisations have failed, while others have given rise to doubts about lack of transparency, state interference, pressures and deals to keep them under hidden state control. Foreign investors are allowed to own up to 49% of the capital of broadcast license holders, but their actual influence on the editorial line is hard to determine.

The Serbian media market remains underdeveloped and saturated. The global economic crisis, with the shrinking of the advertising market, has hindered the financial viability of several media (between 2010 and 2014, the RRA agency has revoked more than 90 licenses, particularly from regional and local media, for lack of payment of license fees), with an overall decrease in the quality of contents as well as in the number of media outlets, and an increase in the risks of business and political pressures. Media are increasingly reliant on state subsidies, which are allocated opaquely, particularly in case of irregular or one-off grants, thus reinforcing the avenues for political pressures. The advertising market is also occupied by state-owned companies

Status and self-regulation of journalists
The category of journalist is not a registered or licensed profession in Serbia, with formal criteria and procedures. There is no legal definition  of "journalist" ("novinar") and its usage is intended in a broad sense. The Journalists' Association recorded in early 2016 around 6,000 journalists in Serbia.

Journalists in Serbia have a low social status and low social protection. Most journalists have irregular income and no health insurance; their average pay is half of the national average salary, and seven times lower than public officials' salaries. Unfavourable working conditions lead to work overload, low quality productions, and a lack of attractiveness of the profession for the talented youth.

Journalists' organisations remain unable to provide efficient protection and secure professional dignity; journalists are poorly paid and have a very low public reputation. The context of business and political pressures, coupled with the lack of legal protection and the difficult working conditions make so that the general perception of the category by the broad public is of politicised and corrupt "dictaphone holders".

Cases of threats and attacks on journalists still persist: in 2008, there were 138 attacks on journalists whilst performing their jobs. The Serbian police is deemed insufficiently effective in tracking down the responsible of threats to journalists.

The journalists' associations UNS and NUNS have each its own code of conduct for journalists. Both agreed to a common Ethical Code of Serbian Journalists (Eticki kodeks novinara Srbije) in 2006. ANEM also adopted an Ethical Code for Broadcasters in 2002, placing truthful reporting at the top. Yet, several violations of the Codes have been reported, particularly by daily political tabloid papers, concerning the presumption of innocence, protection of privacy, and protection of minors. Since 2010, its respect is monitored by the Press Council, a self-regulatory body for the print media. The council can only publish public statements, as sanctions.

A 2015 survey among journalists reported about the casualisation and precariousness of work relations in the profession, but also testified to the persistent professional integrity of Serbian journalists. 75% of Serbian journalists said they believe that self-censorship is widespread, and 80% believe that the state controls the media. Some 40% of journalists would be ready to leave the profession, while 40% would be ready to remain under even lower work conditions, including salaries, if they were allowed to write freely and without interferences.

Media freedom 

The freedom of the press and the freedom of speech are guaranteed by the constitution of Serbia and by the legal system, even if the guarantees enshrined in the laws are not implemented coherently. Serbia ranks 59th out of 180 countries in the 2016 Press Freedom Index report compiled by Reporters without borders, improving its ranking by eight places if compared to 2015. However, according to some experts, this improvement has been of purely statistical nature as it is due more to the worsening trend in the other countries comprised in the Index than on concrete improvements of the situation in Serbia. According to the 2015 Freedom House report, media outlets and journalists in Serbia are subject to pressure from politicians and owners over editorial contents. Also, Serbian media are heavily dependent on advertising contracts and government subsidies which make journalists and media outlets exposed to economic pressures, such as payment defaults, termination of contracts and the like.

Media outlets

Print media

Serbia got its first newspaper in 1834. Politika was launched in 1904 and continues today as a civic-oriented newspaper; it is the oldest daily newspaper in the Balkans. Politika introduced fact-based reporting, editorials, sport sections, and female journalists to the region, thus contributing to the modernization and Europeanization of journalistic standards in Serbia.

During the socialist period, the press in Yugoslavia served as a propaganda tool of the ruling Communist Party. The media landscape was dominated by the Communist Party daily, Borba. Politika evolved into the house organ of the People's Front, a wide union of anti-fascist and socialist forces. The 1960s, with the introduction of workers' self-management, saw the start of the liberation of Yugoslav media from the total dominance by the Communist Party.

In the 1990s, print media were split among supporters and opposers of the regime. The circulation and influence of alternative print media rose throughout the 1990s, and were deemed the avant-garde of democratization. Politika and Borba switched roles: after decades of distancing from the Socialist leadership, Politika aligned with the government, while Borba became a critically oriented newspaper.

After 2000, tabloid press spread, and commercial and entertainment press advanced. Many news outlets were privatized, some of them also in hands of foreign investors, including Politika and Blic. The lack of transparency over ownership of media groups remains an issue, especially for short-lived political tabloids, which are often used for political campaigns. Tabloids in Serbia are "characterized by conservativism, nationalistic ideology, hate speech, and disregard of professional and ethical norms," possibly linked to secret services or political and business interests. The quality press, often the leading independent papers back in the 1990s, suffer today from limited readership and financial difficulties after the withdrawal of external donors. Thin resources result in their journalists specializing mostly on political issues rather than broader topics, like economics or the environment, that could attract new readers interested in quality journalism.

As of 2019, there were 224 newspapers published in Serbia. There are 14 dailies with two of them, Politika and Danas, considered the national papers of record. Eleven of the dailies are Belgrade-based and appeal to a nationwide readership, but two are regional, with Novi Sad's Dnevnik focused on the north and Niš's Narodne Novine focused on the south. The remaining daily, Magyar Szó, is published in Hungarian in the border town of Subotica. The tabloids Blic, Informer, Kurir, and Večernje Novosti claim the highest circulations, some claiming more than 100,000 daily copies, but do not provide audited figures.  Two dailies specialize, with Sportski Žurnal focused on sports and Privredni Pregled focused on business.

As of 2019, there were 1,427 magazines published in Serbia. These include weekly newsmagazines NIN, Vreme and Nedeljnik, popular science magazine Politikin Zabavnik, women's interest Lepota & Zdravlje, technology magazine Svet Kompjutera. In addition, there are many Serbian editions of international titles, such as Cosmopolitan, Elle, Grazia, Men's Health, National Geographic, Le Monde Diplomatique, Playboy, Hello! and others.

The 2009 Nielsen survey reported that print media accounted approximately for 22.4% of the total media revenue in the country.

Radio broadcasting

Radio Belgrade started operating in 1929 as a state enterprise. The earlier local radio stations appeared after World War Two – the first one in Zaječar in 1944 – and started growing since the 1960s. They were funded by local governments and set up with the expertise of Radio Beograd, as part of the media instruments of local governments, together with local newspapers and later TV stations.

Commercial radio stations were established only in the 1990s. A precursors was Studio B, set up in 1970 by the journalists of Borba (back then the Communist Party's newspaper), based on the model of western radio stations, with a lot of music and some short local news programmes focusing on everyday life's issues and how to solve them – as opposed to the much more establishment-style (top-down and politics-focused) of Radio Belgrade. Its style found a country-wide success.

The 1990s saw the explosion of free radios: between 500 and 700 operated throughout the country at that time, most of them without licenses. The biggest radios (including Radio Belgrade) remained under government control. Private stations worked as alternative sources of news. Radio B92 gained a special prominence in this period: starting as an experimental youth initiative in Belgrade in 1989, it conquered its audience with irony and mockery, developing from an underground project to the most prominent alternative media, promoting liberal and humanistic spirit and antiwar and anti-nationalist orientation. The government closed it down four times, but every time it gathered even stronger support. B92 also spurred the growth of a network of independent radios (ANEM), re-broadcasting B92 news programmes together with locally produced contents. The role of B92 in fostering free media won it the MTV Free Your Mind award in 1998, together with many other awards.

The 2002 Broadcasting Law ended the 1990s legislative chaos in the radio field. Frequences and licenses' allocations were completed only five years later. Altogether, 277 licences were issued: 3 channels for the public service provider Radio Belgrade, and 5 nationwide private stations (Radio B92 - later renamed Play Radio, Radio S which recently became Radio S1, Radio Index - recently renamed Radio S2, Roadstar Radio which became Radio Hit FM, and Radio Fokus which is now defunct); 37 regional radios, and 235 local ones. Yet, regulation did not solve all problems of the radio sector. The market remains overcrowded, with many small outlets competing for an equally small advertising market. Only 4% of the advertisement expenses were devoted to radio ads in 2009 (TV got 59%). The press received six times more advertisement expenses.

There are currently 220 radio stations in Serbia. Out of these, seven are radio stations with national coverage, including three of public broadcaster Radio Television of Serbia (Radio Belgrade 1, Radio Belgrade 2/Radio Belgrade 3 and Radio Belgrade 202), and four private ones (Radio S1, Radio S2, Play Radio, and Radio Hit FM). Also, there are 49 regional stations and 162 local stations.

Television broadcasting

Television broadcasting started in 1958 with each Yugoslav republic having its own station. In Serbia, the state television station was known as Television Belgrade (RTB) and became known as Radio Television of Serbia after the breakup of Yugoslavia. A second channel was launched in 1972, and a third in 1989. Under the Communists and Slobodan Milošević, state broadcasting was controlled by the ruling party, leading to RTS headquarters being targeted and bombed during the NATO action against Yugoslavia.

The system developed from a public monopoly, with regional centres like TV Novi Sad and TV Pristina, into a dual, public and private system. The government, while suppressing the development of alternative statewide channels, allowed the broadcasts of regional and local commercial stations (which could profit from unlimited advertisement time to sell), as well as new pro-government local TV outlets. After the fall of Milošević, RTS became known as Nova RTS (an assertion of independence), while B92 commenced broadcasting.

Television remains the most widespread and popular medium in Serbia. According to AGB Nielsen Research in 2009, Serbs watch five hours of television per day on average, the highest average in Europe. Television is the main source of news and information for citizens (85%, against 11% for the press and 2% for radio and internet each), while the biggest share of audience goes to entertainment programmes. The financial sustainability of the whole sector remains in doubt, and broadcasters favour cheap and light programmes rather than high-quality in-house productions.

The television market in Serbia is saturated. In 2001, there were 253 TV stations; that was later halved to 109 licenses. There are seven nationwide free-to-air television channels, with public broadcaster Radio Television of Serbia (RTS) operating three (RTS1, RTS2 and RTS3) and four private broadcasters: Prva, O2.TV, Pink and Happy TV. Viewing shares for these channels in 2016 were: 19.2% for RTS1, 14.8% for Pink, 9.7% for Prva, 7.9% for Happy TV, 5.8% for B92, and 3.1% for RTS2. There are 28 regional channels and 74 local channels. Besides terrestrial channels there are a dozen Serbian television channels available only on cable or satellite.

Serbia completed the transition to digital broadcasting in 2015, having chosen MPEG-4 compression standard and DVB-T2 standard for signal transmission.

News agencies 
There are three national news agencies in Serbia: Beta, Fonet and Tanjug Tačno ("Tačno" d.o.o. uses intellectual rights of former state news agency Tanjug).

 Beta was launched in 1994 by 12 journalists and has today more than 200 employees, providing services in Serbian, English, and minority languages (Hungarian, Albanian, Romani) on the event in the wider Southeast Europe region. Beta founded and manages two radio stations: Radio Beta-RFI in Belgrade, in cooperation with Radio France Internationale, and Radio Sto Plus in Novi Pazar. It also runs the web portal Argus focused on the fight to corruption and organised crime. Its ownership is still in the hands of the founder journalists, who invested all profits in the development of the agency.
 Fonet with about 50 employees, provides a special service on EU news (Euroservice).
 Tanjug Tačno was registered in 2020 and since March 2021, it uses intellectual rights of now defunct Tanjug, and continues to publish news under that brand.

 Tanjug was a state-owned news agency, founded in 1945 which ceased its operation in 2015, and officially in 2021. Tanjug's name is derived from Tito's resistance's "Telegraph Agency of the New Yugoslavia", and achieved international prominence in the 1970s, covering West, East and non-aligned countries' events – taking part in the Non-Aligned News Agency Pool, and ranking among the top 10 largest news agencies in the world with 48 correspondents, 900 employees, and 400 news items per day. In the 1990s, it became the main tool for the government's position. Journalists left for either newly established state news agencies in other post-Yugoslav countries, or for new private agencies Fonet (February 1994) and Beta (May 1994), that allowed media pluralism to persist in 1990s Serbia. Its photo archives, with 3.5 million negatives about the most important events in former Yugoslavia, Serbia and abroad, starting from World War II, remained the most important in the region and after the liquidation of the agency they were transferred to the Archives of Yugoslavia.

Online media

The total number of online publications in Serbia is not known. The Serbian Business Registers Agency counted 66 registered Internet media outlets in May 2010. Freedom House reports around 200 online news portals in 2014, and  54% of Serbian residents with internet access.

Internet media have long remained marginal in the Serbian media market. In 2009, the Nielsen survey reported that they accounted for only 1.6% of the total media revenue in the country. Traditional media have taken up online position too, following the lead of B92 and its concept of super desk, editing stories for radio, TV and website alike. B92's website was launched in 1995, and the internet represented a useful alternative for news circulation during periods of radio bans by the state.

, the most visited websites in Serbian (mainly on the .rs domain) are the Serbian version of Google followed by online editions of printed daily Blic, news web-portal of B92 broadcaster, news portal of printed daily Kurir and classifieds KupujemProdajem.

Serbia's internet domain shifted gradually from .yu (Yugoslavia) to .rs (Republic of Serbia) after 2008. The national authority on internet domains is the Serbian National Register of Internet Domain Names (Registar nacionalnog internet domena Srbije, RNIDS).

Sputnik, a news agency affiliated with the Russian government, launched in Serbia in 2019. By July 2021 it had accrued more than 200,000 followers on Facebook.

Online local media

Media Organisations

Trade unions 
Serbia has two national professional journalistic associations: the Journalists' Association of Serbia (Udruzenje novinara Srbije – UNS) and the Independent Journalists' Association of Serbia (Nezavisno udruzenje novinara Srbije – NUNS), often in conflict. NUNS has a regional affiliate in the Independent Journalists' Association of Vojvodina (NDNV). No organisation advocates for the rights of freelance journalists.

UNS was founded in Belgrade in 1881, and in Socialist times defended the autonomy of the media within the limis of the self-government ideology of the Yugoslav Communist Party. During Milosevic' rule, journalists split between those interested in the protection of the "national interest", seeing the media as a state tool, and those interested in the protection of the profession, focusing on the development of a pluralist society and the need for impartiality and balance in the journalistic profession, thus trying to resist to political pressures. UNS leaders promoted the defense of "Serbian interests" and "patriotic journalism". Many members of the association left it and founded NUNS in 1994. UNS disassociated itself from its previous behaviour after Milosevic's fall: in 2001 it excluded eight former leading journalists. Yet, its collaboration with the previous government remains a bone of contention with NUNS, that pushes for a ban over all journalists associated with the former administration's promotion of war, hate speech, ethnic and political discrimination. In 2009 NUNS launched criminal charges against those journalist who had been working in RTV Belgrade, RTV Novi Sad and dailies Vecernje Novosti and Politika in the 1990s, while UNS defended them as persons who "just did their job" and remains opposed to the re-examination of media behaviour in the 1990s.

In 2000 UNS declared 1,514 members, NUNS declared 1,410 members, while around 3,000 journalists remained unassociated. Today, UNS remains the main journalists' association in Serbia, with about 6,000 members, against NUNS' 2,400. Both associations are members of the International Federation of Journalists, and strive for the protection of the legal and social aspects of journalism, the promotion of free journalism and media pluralism, and the development of professional norms and ethical standards.

Serbia does not have a tradition of journalists' trade unions and media business organisations, as associations have been dealing with social protection in the past. Journalists in Serbia remain underpaid and under-employed, often without a regular contract and below minimal wages. Journalists working in local media at risk of bankruptcy are particularly exposed, since they are left without social protection.
 In 2003, UNS established the Journalists Union of Serbia, with around 800 members, to draft a national collective agreement and help journalists bargain with media owners.
 The Association of Independent Electronic Media (Asocijacija nezavisnih elektronskih medija – ANEM), is a business organisation of 28 radio stations and 16 television companies (national and local, big and small), plus other organisations, launched in 1993 to strengthen the independence of media non-affiliated with the government. It strives for the establishment of a politically independent legal framework, for an economically viable environment for the development of electronic media, and for the improvement of professional and technical standards in the media sphere. ANEM provides lobbying for the media laws, education of media staff, legal help, and technical support for its members.
 The Association of Local Independent Media ("Local Press") is the media organisation of the local print media, established in 1995 and with 25 members. 
 Media Association (Asocijacija medija) gathers some big publishers, including Vecernje Novosti, Ringier Serbia, Color Press Group, Politika newspaper and magazines, Press Publishing Group, Adria Media Serbia, Dnevnik-Vojvodinapress, Ekonomist, Vreme and VojvodinaInfo. It aims at improving professional standards in journalism (such as the Press Council) and securing the independence of its members from political and economic pressures.

Regulatory authorities
The regulation of the media sphere is a task for several agencies. The Republic Broadcasting Agency (RRA) was established in 2005, followed by the Republic Telecommunication Agency (RATEL), in charge of the telecommunications field. The print media is not regulated, but since 2010 the Press Council works as a self-regulatory body to ensure the implementation of the journalists' Ethical Code. New media are not regulated.

Republic Broadcasting Agency
The RRA is defined as an "autonomous legal entity", "functionally independent of any state organ, as well as of any organisation or person involved in the production and broadcasting of radio and TV programmes".

The RRA has taken over wide competencies formerly tasked to state bodies, including issuing broadcasting licences (which is legally conditioned to the lack of owners' affiliations to political parties and setting the rules during electoral campaigns or mourning periods. It also monitors the compliance of Serbian media with the Broadcasting Law, and decides on complaints. It oversees the transformation of RTS in a public service broadcaster and appoints the managing board of RTS, which chooses its directors.

The independence of the RRA is formally guaranteed by a couple of mechanisms:
 First, its Board members are elected by the Parliament, based on nominations coming from civil society organisations (the Culture and Media Committee of the National Assembly, the Assembly of the Province of Vojvodina, academia, NGOs and the professional media community). Candidates cannot be state or party officials, nor have vested interest in programming production or broadcasting.
 Second, the RRA has its own sources of revenues in the broadcasting license fees.

Yet, the independence, accountability and impartiality of the RRA, as well as its capacities, remains in doubt. Selection and nomination rules are open to multiple interpretations and give way to arbitrariness and possible political pressures.
According to the European Journalism Centre, the RRA lacks human and financial resources to perform its tasks. It does not manage to monitor the broadcasters nor to publish its results. While broadcasters have admittedly violated advertisement regulators, the RRA pressed charges against them only in 2010. The Agency is deemed not transparent enough, and recurrent squabbles over the nomination of its board have reduced its credibility in the eyes of the public.

The establishment of independent regulatory bodies in Serbia went through several issues. The appointment of the first RRA Council created a two-years long political crisis for the breach of rules for their nomination. The delay meant that the Broadcasting Law was implemented slowly too, including the tendering for and issuing of 467 broadcasting licences, the privatisation of broadcasting media and transformation of the national and Vojvodina province state broadcasters into a public service. The RRA remained crippled by the original credibility crisis and the two-years long process of frequency allocation gave rise to doubts about its independence. Subsequent amendments to the Broadcasting Law opened up new avenues for possible political pressures over the RRA, e.g. when nominees of the Parliament and government got a longer term mandate than the nominees of professional and civil society organisations.

According to journalists, the RRA charges excessive and arbitrary license fees to broadcasters. Print and online media are exempt from license requirements.

Republic Telecommunications Agency
The Republic Telecommunications Agency (RATEL) was foreseen by the 2003 Telecommunications Law and started operating in 2005. It defines the conditions for radio frequency spectrum usage, the Radio Frequency Allocation Plan, allocates radio and TV frequencies, and monitors their usage.

Press Council
The Press Council is a self-regulatory body for the print media. It was established at the beginning of 2010, after years of planning and debating its structure, decision-making, sources of finance. It includes representatives of press publishers, professional journalistic organisations, and it aims to monitor the respect of the 2006 Ethical Code and deal with complaints by individuals and institutions.

See also
 Media freedom in Serbia
 Censorship in Serbia
 Television in Serbia
 List of newspapers in Serbia
 Serbian culture#Serbian media

References

Sources

 
Serbia
Serbia